Madhavi is an Indian play written in Hindi by Bhisham Sahni. This is a play in three acts which recounts an ancient tale of Madhavi, daughter of king Yayati from Mahabharata.

Plot
The play is based on the story of Madhavi, daughter of King Yayati.

Performances in theatre
The play has been staged in different forms over the years. It was first staged by director Rajendra Nath in 1982. In 2005, Rashi Bunny performed it as a solo play directed by Arvind Gaur.

In 2016, the play was staged in Shilpee theatre in Kathmandu. The play was staged and translated into Nepali by Tanka Chaulagain and starred Yuvraj Ghimire, Jeevan Baral, Archana Panthi, Pradip Regmi, etc.

References

Books about politics of India
Rajkamal Prakashan books
Indian plays
1982 plays
Hindi theatre
Works based on the Mahabharata